Fitzroy Robinson & Partners was one of the UK's largest firms of architects. It was based at Devonshire Street in London.

History
The firm was established by Herbert Fitzroy Robinson in 1956. Public buildings designed by the firm included 102 Petty France in London, originally the headquarters of the Home Office and now the home of the Ministry of Justice. The firm was acquired by Aukett Associates in 2005.

References

British companies established in 1956
Architecture firms based in London
Defunct companies based in London
1956 establishments in England
2005 disestablishments in England
British companies disestablished in 2005